The SMU Mustangs football program is a college football team representing Southern Methodist University (SMU) in University Park in Dallas County, Texas. The team competes in the NCAA Football Bowl Subdivision (FBS) as a member of the American Athletic Conference (The American).

History

Early history (1915–1917)
In June 1915, Ray Morrison became SMU's football, baseball, basketball, and track coach, in addition to being a math instructor. The football team began as a member of the Texas Intercollegiate Athletic Association, playing at Armstrong Field. The first game played by SMU's football team was a 13–2 victory over Hendrix College. After winning two games in a span of two seasons, Morrison left SMU for Fort Oglethorpe upon the United States’ entry into World War I.

During this time, the football team was known as "the Parsons", due to the large number of theology students on the team. On October 17, 1917, the name "Mustangs" was selected as the school's mascot. For the 1917 season, Morrison was replaced by J. Burton Rix, who led the Mustangs to a 3–2–3 record in their final season in the TIAA.

Joining the Southwest Conference (1918–1921)
The 1918 season was the first of many seasons for the SMU Mustangs as a member of the Southwest Conference, joining Baylor University, Rice University, the University of Texas, Texas A&M University, the University of Arkansas, and Oklahoma A&M University. The Mustangs’ first season in the conference ended with a 4–2 record. J. Burton Rix continued to coach the team in the 1921 season, but after two games, Rix resigned and E. William (Bill) Cunningham took over as interim head coach for the remainder of the season, as the team went on to finish with a 1-6-1 record.

The return of Morrison (1922–1934)
Ray Morrison returned to SMU in 1922, co-coaching the team with former Vanderbilt teammate Ewing Y. Freeland. For the 1922 and 1923 seasons, Morrison focused on the backfield and ends, while Freeland focused on the linemen. The team became known as the "Aerial Circus" by sportswriters because of Morrison's passing offense. Morrison became known as "the father of the forward pass", due to the team's use of passing on first and second downs, instead of as a play of last resort. At the time, most teams utilized the forward pass five to six times in one game, while SMU did so between 30 and 40 times.

In the 1922 season, the Mustangs compiled a 6–3–1 record. Furthermore, end Gene Bedford and back Logan Stollenwerck were named first-team All-Southwest Conference, becoming the first SMU football players to receive that honor. Bedford was the first player to play in the National Football League, for the Rochester Jeffersons.
In the 1923 season, the SMU Mustangs achieved a perfect 9–0 record, winning their first conference football title in school history. After this season, Freeland left the SMU football team, later becoming head coach for the Texas Technological College football team, leaving Morrison as the sole head coach for SMU. SMU played in their first bowl game in 1924, in the Dixie Classic against West Virginia Wesleyan College, but lost that game 7–9.

By 1926, the team began playing their home games at Ownby Stadium. In their first game at Ownby Stadium, the Mustangs defeated North Texas State Teachers College 42–0, led by quarterback Gerald Mann. The first Homecoming game was also played in 1926, resulting in a 14–13 victory over Texas Christian University.

The team continued to have winning seasons until the 1932 season. The Mustangs won their second conference title in 1926, compiling an 8–0–1 record, and a third conference title in 1931, compiling a 9–0–1 record. In 1928, guard Choc Sanders became SMU's first All-American, as well the first All-American from the Southwest Conference. In 1929, tackle Marion Hammon became SMU's second All-American.  After a winning 1934 season, Morrison left SMU to take over the Vanderbilt Commodores football team after the retirement of Dan McGugin.

A national championship (1935–1941)
Morrison was replaced by Matty Bell in 1935. In his first season, Bell led the Mustangs to a 12–1 record. During this season, the Mustangs were crowned national champions by Frank Dickinson and Deke Houlgate, two of seven contemporaneous selectors, all math systems, that chose five different national champions that year. To play in the Rose Bowl against the Stanford Indians football team for the unofficial national championship, SMU faced off against the TCU Horned Frogs, who featured star quarterback Sammy Baugh.

The Mustangs had three more winning seasons from 1936 to 1939. SMU failed to win the Southwest Conference title in 1940, despite having the same conference record as the Texas A&M Aggies. After a 5–5 season in 1941, Bell left SMU to serve in the United States Navy during World War II.

The war years (1942–1944)
With Bell in the Navy, Jimmy Stewart took his place as head coach. In his three seasons as head coach, Stewart compiled an overall record of 10–18–2. Bell returned as head coach for the 1945 season.

Doak Walker era (1945–1949)
Upon Bell's return as SMU's head coach, the team also gained halfback and placekicker Doak Walker. Walker won All-Southwest Conference honors his freshman year in 1945 and played in the East–West Shrine Game in San Francisco. Walker did not play for the 1946 season due to serving in the United States Army, yet re-enrolled at SMU and rejoined the football team for the 1947 season.

The Mustangs posted a 9–0–2 record in 1947, winning their sixth Southwest Conference title. In the same season, the team played against the Penn State Nittany Lions in the Cotton Bowl Classic, resulting in a 13–13 tie. Walker threw a 53-yard touchdown pass and scored on a two-yard run in this game. Walker earned the Maxwell Award during this season.

During the 1948 season, the Mustangs won their seventh conference title, posting a 9–1–1 record. The team played in the Cotton Bowl Classic once more, defeating the Oregon Webfoots, who were led by quarterback Norm Van Brocklin, 21–13, making it their first victory in a bowl game in school history. Doak Walker, winning All-American honors, also won the Heisman Trophy, the first Mustang to do so in school history. Additionally, the Mustangs permanently moved to the Cotton Bowl for their home games this season, after playing only limited numbers of games in that stadium in years previous. In their final game at Ownby Stadium, the Mustangs defeated Texas Tech 41–6. Due to Doak Walker's popularity and gate draw—also as an allusion to 1923 Yankee Stadium's House that Ruth Built″ moniker referring to that stadium's likewise excess of capacity—the Cotton Bowl became regionally known as "The House that Doak Built".

The 1949 season was both Doak Walker's and coach Matty Bell's last as part of SMU's varsity football team and program. The team posted a 5–4–1 record. Walker won All-American honors a third time, the most for any football player in SMU's history. Bell continued to serve SMU as the athletic director, while Walker played in the NFL for the Detroit Lions. Over the course of his career at SMU, Walker rushed for 1,954 yards, passed for 1,638 yards, scored 288 points, punted for a 39.4 average and kicked field goals and extra points. He is also the Mustangs' all-time leader in punt return yards with 750—that was during an "era" of NCAA single-platoon substitution rules. Bell left the head coaching position at SMU with a 79–40–8 record, including three Southwest Conference titles, a bowl game victory, and a national championship.

Russell, Woodard, and Meek eras (1950–1961)
Bell was replaced by Rusty Russell in 1950. Russell previously served as quarterbacks and running backs coach from 1945 to 1949, and is attributed to luring Doak Walker away from the University of Texas. In three seasons as head coach, Russell compiled a 13–15–2 record. After a strong first season, in which the Mustangs were ranked number one in the nation, the team suffered two losing seasons. Becoming increasingly under fire, Russell resigned as head coach after the 1952 season.

Kyle Rote, who filled Doak Walker's place on the team, led the Southwest Conference with 777 yards rushing in 1949, and was named an All-American following the 1950 season. Quarterback Fred Benners led the Mustangs to perhaps their greatest win of the decade when he completed 22 of 42 passes for 336 yards to beat Notre Dame, 27–20, in Notre Dame, Indiana on October 13, 1951. Benners connected on TD passes of 57, 37, 31 and four yards to four different receivers as the Mustangs beat the Fighting Irish in what was one of the highlights in a 3–6–1 season. Furthermore, Forrest Gregg became part of the team in 1952, and became a two-time All-Southwest Conference player by 1955, later moving on to the NFL. Moreover, David Powell became SMU's first Academic All-American winner in the 1952 season.

Woody Woodard took Russell's place as head coach in 1953. Woodard compiled a 19–20–1 record in his four seasons as head coach for SMU, resigning after two consecutive losing seasons.  During the 1954 season, wide receiver Raymond Berry was elected as a co-captain, despite only catching 11 passes for 144 yards, winning All-Southwest Conference and Academic All-American honors, and later played in the NFL for the Baltimore Colts.

Woodard was replaced by Bill Meek in 1957, who was coming off a Missouri Valley Conference title-winning season with the Houston Cougars football team. In five seasons with SMU, Meek compiled a 17–29–4 record. During Meek's time as head coach, quarterback Don Meredith earned All-American honors in 1958 and 1959, with his .610 career completion percentage being the best of any passer in SMU history, with a tremendous running ability increasing pressure on opposing defenses. The 1960 season, though, proved particularly bad for the Mustangs, as they went 0–9–1, with the only game decided by less than 10 points being a 0–0 tie with Texas A&M.

Hayden Fry era (1962–1972)
Hayden Fry became the eighth head coach in 1962. The Mustangs hosted the fourth-ranked Navy Midshipmen and its quarterback, Roger Staubach, on October 11, 1963, at the Cotton Bowl. On its way to a 4–7 season, SMU was given little chance to beat the Midshipmen. Little-known sophomore John Roderick rushed for 146 yards on 11 carries and scored on touchdown runs of 45 and two yards for the Mustangs. The SMU defense, led by Bob Oyler, Martin Cude, Bill Harlan, Harold Magers and Doug January, sent Staubach to the bench twice with a dislocated left shoulder. Trailing 28–26 with 2:52 remaining in the game, SMU had one last chance to pull off the upset. Quarterback Danny Thomas threw to Billy Gannon, who ran to the Navy 46. On the next play, Roderick took a pitchout 23 yards to the 23. After a pass interference penalty against Navy put the ball on the one-yard line, Gannon plowed over the right tackle for the winning touchdown with 2:05 left. The SMU defense held off Staubach's effort to rally his team for one last score, as the Mustangs pulled off the 32–28 upset. Despite a losing record in 1963, the Mustangs played in the Sun Bowl, their first since the 1948 season, against the Oregon Webfoots, losing 14–21.

When Fry took the job at SMU, he was promised that he would be allowed to recruit black athletes.  Jerry LeVias became the first black player signed to a football scholarship in the Southwest Conference. In 1966, LeVias made his debut one week after John Hill Westbrook of Baylor became the first black player to play for a conference team. Fry received abuse for recruiting a black player to SMU in the form of hate mail and threatening phone calls, but he downplayed the treatment, because the harassment of LeVias was much, much worse.

During the 1966 season, Hayden Fry lifted SMU back to national prominence, when SMU was ranked ninth in the nation and won its first conference championship in 18 years, their seventh overall. Fry also won Conference Coach of the Year. SMU lost the Cotton Bowl Classic to the Georgia Bulldogs 9–24. John LaGrone, who earned conference honors from 1964 to 1966, was the first Mustang player to be selected as both an All-American and Academic All-American when he was honored following the 1966 season.

During the 1968 season, combined with quarterback Chuck Hixson, Levias helped lead the Mustangs to a 28–27 win over Oklahoma in the 1968 Astro-Bluebonnet Bowl, giving SMU its first bowl victory since the 1949 Cotton Bowl Classic. SMU and Oklahoma combined to score 35 points in the fourth quarter. SMU stopped Oklahoma short of a potential game-winning two-point conversion with 1:16 left to play. LeVias was selected as an all-conference player as a senior for the third time.

Fry's Mustangs then had just a 12–20 record over the next three years, from 1969 to 1971. That put Fry's job risking, and rumors started to swirl after the Mustangs started the 1972 season at 4–4. Not even a three-game winning streak could save Fry. After a 7–4 season in 1972, Fry was fired at SMU, which robbed the Mustangs of a bowl berth. In his 11 seasons at SMU, Fry compiled a 49–66–1 record.

Dave Smith era (1973–1975)
After Fry's departure, Dave Smith, a former assistant coach under Fry, took his place as head coach. Coming off a 7–4 season with Oklahoma State, Smith had two consecutive 6–4–1 seasons with SMU, with his final season resulting in a 4–7 record. In three seasons with SMU, Smith compiled a 16–15–2 record. Smith was replaced by Ron Meyer in 1976.

A winning record (1976–1986)
Coach Ron Meyer came to SMU in 1976 from the Dallas Cowboys in the 1970s (including a Super Bowl win) and a stint with UNLV. Coach Meyer was notable for his recruiting tactics, including visits each year to the homes of 70 or more of the top recruits per year. His most notable recruits were future NFL running backs Eric Dickerson and Craig James before the 1979 season, as both their high school teams went 15–0 and won state championships. Combined with blue chip running back Charles Waggoner, the three backs were nicknamed the "Pony Express" running attack and shredded opposing defenses in the option offense led by quarterback Lance McIlhenny.  In 1981, the Mustangs' performance earned them recognition by the National Championship Foundation as one of its five co-national champions. The final Associated Press poll ranked SMU No. 5, four spots behind AP national champion Clemson. The team was not ranked in the coaches' poll at all due to a rule forbidding teams on probation from consideration. 

Coach Meyer left to become the head coach of the New England Patriots in 1982, and SMU hired Coach Bobby Collins, then head coach at the University of Southern Mississippi. Dickerson finished 3rd in the Heisman Trophy voting in 1982, and the team claimed a share of its second consecutive national championship, being selected by Bill Schroeder of the Helms Athletic Foundation as his last ever selection, in addition to consensus champion Penn State; the Mustangs did, however, finish second in both the AP and coaches' polls.

SMU posted a 49–9–1 record from 1980 to 1984, which was the highest win percentage (.839) in Division I-A over that span.

"Death Penalty" and decades of rebuilding (1987–2007)

In 1987, SMU football became the first, and only, football program in collegiate athletic history to receive the "death penalty" for repeat violation of NCAA rules; that is, having a sports program fully terminated for a determined amount of time. SMU's football program was terminated for the 1987 season because the university was making approximately $61,000 in booster payments from 1985 to 1986. It later emerged that a slush fund had been used to pay players as early as the mid-1970s, and athletic officials had known about it as early as 1981.

SMU was eligible for the "death penalty" because it had been placed on probation in 1985 for recruiting violations. Since many potential student-athletes were poor, boosters would induce them to sign with SMU by offering them payments and expense coverage. Several key boosters and administration officials determined that it would not only be unethical to cut off those payments, but also potentially problematic as some boosters were contractually obligated to pay the athletes for the duration of their time at SMU. There was also the real potential of disgruntled football players "blowing the whistle" on SMU should the payments not continue. When the sanctions were handed down, SMU had three players – all seniors about to graduate – receiving payments. Not long afterward, SMU announced that its football team would stay shuttered for the 1988 season as well after school officials received indications that they wouldn't have enough experienced players to field a viable team, as most of the team had left the university and transferred to other institutions. Forrest Gregg, an SMU alum who was the head coach of the Green Bay Packers, was hired in 1988 to help rebuild the team. The decimation of the program meant that Gregg was left with an undersized and underweight lineup.

The Mustangs struggled for 20 years to recover from the effects of the scandal. Coach Gregg compiled a 3–19 record in his two seasons. He moved on to be the SMU Athletic Director from 1990 through 1994. The program's chances of ever recovering were likely ruined by the collapse of the Southwest Conference after the 1995 season; SMU wound up  in the WAC and later in Conference USA.

The Mustangs had three more head coaches and only one winning season through the completion of the 2007 season.

"There and Back Again" (2008–2014)

In 2008 SMU hired Steve Orsini away from the University of Central Florida (UCF) to be the SMU Athletic Director.  Orsini then hired June Jones from the University of Hawai'i to be the team's new head coach at SMU and the 5th coach in the post-death penalty time since 1989.  In Jones' first season at SMU, the team had a 1–11 record.
In 2009, Coach Jones' second season at SMU, the Mustangs had a turnaround season, compiling an improved regular season record of 7–5.  Although finishing unranked in the 2009 NCAA Division I FBS football rankings, SMU was invited to its first bowl game in 25 years, defeating the unranked Nevada Wolf Pack with a final score of 45–10 in the 2009 Hawai'i Bowl, the team's first bowl win since 1984.

In 2010, the Mustangs again compiled a regular season record of 7–5, with a 6–2 in-conference record to earn their first chance at winning a conference title in 26 years, securing a berth in the Conference USA Championship game.  SMU lost the conference title game, 17–7, against UCF.  Once again unranked in the 2010 NCAA Division I FBS football rankings, SMU was invited to its second consecutive bowl game, the 2010 Armed Forces Bowl, where it lost against the unranked Army Black Knights.

Following Texas A&M's move to the SEC in August and September 2011, SMU made it known that they would like to replace Texas A&M in the Big 12.  SMU's interest in the Big 12 was never reciprocated, and the Big 12 instead added TCU and West Virginia University.

SMU went on to win back-to-back bowl games in the 2012 BBVA Compass Bowl (for the 2011 season) and 2012 Hawaii Bowl. SMU ended the Jones Era in 2014 the way it began: with a 1–11 season. The Mustangs won the last game of the season against the University of Connecticut on December 6, 2014.

Chad Morris (2015–2017)
SMU hired Clemson offensive coordinator Chad Morris as head coach and announced his placement on December 1, 2014. His first season resulted in a 2–10 record, a slight improvement from the 2014 season. SMU continued to improve in Morris' second season, finishing 5–7. In his 3rd season, Morris was able to lead the Mustangs to bowl eligibility and a 7–5 record in 2017. However, Morris accepted the head coaching position at Arkansas in the weeks prior to the bowl game, and SMU was forced to move quickly to hire a new football coach in light of the approaching bowl game.

Sonny Dykes (2017–2021) 
Sonny Dykes was hired as the new football coach of SMU on December 11, 2017. The Mustangs were defeated by Louisiana Tech 51–10 in the DXL Frisco Bowl.

In the 2019 season, the Mustangs got off to an 8–0 start. On September 21, they defeated cross-town rival TCU. On September 29, the Mustangs were ranked in the AP top 25 for the first time since October 25, 1986.

Rhett Lashlee (2021–present) 
Rhett Lashlee returned to SMU as Head Football Coach on Nov. 29, 2021. Lashlee previously served as offensive coordinator for the Mustangs, including during the record-setting 2019 season.

Conference affiliations
 Texas Intercollegiate Athletic Association (1915–1917)
 Southwest Conference (1918–1995)
 Western Athletic Conference (1996–2004)
 Conference USA (2005–2012)
 American Athletic Conference (2013–present)

Championships

National championships
SMU has won three national championships from NCAA-designated major selectors. SMU claims all three championships.

Conference championships
SMU has won 11 conference championships, nine outright and two shared.

† Co-champions

Division championships
SMU has won two division championships.

† Co-champions

Bowl games
SMU has participated in 17 bowl games. The Mustangs have a record of 7–9–1 in these games.

Head coaches
List of SMU head coaches.

Rivalries

TCU

The rivalry with TCU is the most intense one for both schools. The respective campuses are located 40 miles apart in the Dallas-Fort Worth Metroplex. The SMU-TCU rivalries go for all sports as well as recruiting students from the DFW area, as SMU and TCU are the two top schools in the region in academics and sports. The teams have played all but seven years since their first meeting in 1915. They did not face each other in 1919, 1920, 1925, 1987, 1988, 2006, or 2020.

TCU and SMU fans began the tradition back in 1946. During pre-game festivities, an SMU fan was frying frog legs as a joke before the game. A TCU fan, seeing this desecration of the "frog", went over and told him that eating the frog legs was going well beyond the rivalry and that they should let the game decide who would get the skillet and the frog legs. TCU won the game, and the skillet and frog legs went to TCU. The tradition eventually spilled over into the actual game, and the Iron Skillet is now passed to the winner.

SMU and TCU have agreed to play each season through 2024 on an alternating home-and-home format.

TCU leads the series 52–42–7 through the 2022 season.

North Texas

Nicknamed the "Safeway Bowl", the rivalry between SMU and North Texas is the most one-sided rivalry for the Mustangs. Its name is derived from a challenge from then North Texas head coach Matt Simon issued in 1994 after a two-year break in the series, stating "I'd like to play because I think we could beat them, and my players feel the same way. If they'd like to play on a Safeway parking lot ... just give us a date and time." North Texas generally considers SMU its biggest rival, but SMU downplays North Texas as a real rival. SMU and North Texas are located about 40 miles apart in the Dallas-Fort Worth Metroplex.

The schools have played on and off 42 times dating back to 1922 with three major hiatuses, from 1943 to 1973, from 1993 to 2005, and from 2008 to 2013.

North Texas is joining the American Athletic Conference in 2023, so this will become a conference game for the first time.

SMU leads the series 35–6–1 through the 2022 season.

Navy

SMU and Navy have played each other 23 times, with Navy leading the series 13–10. In 2009, the athletic departments of the United States Naval Academy and Southern Methodist University created the Gansz Trophy in honor of Frank Gansz who played linebacker at the Naval Academy from 1957 through 1959, was on the Navy coaching staff from 1969 through 1972, and the coaching staff at SMU for the 2008 season before his spring 2009 death.

Navy joined the American Athletic Conference in 2015 which allowed for this game to become a yearly conference game.

SMU won the 2022 game and thus currently holds the Gansz Trophy.

Navy leads the series 13–11 through the 2022 season.

Rice

The SMU-Rice rivalry is a secondary one for both SMU (after TCU) and Rice (after Houston). However, it is a storied one since SMU is located inside the city of Dallas and Rice is located in Houston, the anchors of Texas's two largest metropolitan areas. Notably, SMU and Rice are two of the smaller universities in NCAA Division I FBS. Adding fuel to the fire is the fact that Rice and SMU are consistently ranked the best two private universities in Texas.

In 1918 both schools joined the Southwest Conference, and from 1926 they played every year except for 1987 and 1988, after the NCAA gave SMU's football program the "death penalty" following a cheating scandal. They played in the same conference until 2013, beginning with the Southwest (1918–1996), then the Western Athletic Conference (1996–2005) and Conference USA (2005–2012). In that time, they had met 90 times, with SMU leading 48–41–1.

In 1998 a traveling trophy, the "Mayor's Cup", was introduced to the series, and had been awarded to the winner each year through 2012. The Rice Owls hold the trophy after the 2012 game and lead the trophy series 9–6. 

SMU left Conference USA for The American for the 2013 season, and no games have been played or scheduled since the 2012 meeting. However, Rice is joining the American Athletic Conference in 2023, so this will become a conference game again for the first time since 2012.

SMU leads the series 48–41–1 through the 2021 season.

Appearances in the final Associated Press Poll
SMU has made 175 appearances in the Associated Press poll over 103 seasons. SMU has been ranked in the top 10 for 63 weeks.

Home fields
 Armstrong Field (1915–1925)
 Ownby Stadium (1926–1948, 1989–1994)
 Cotton Bowl (1932–1978, 1995–1999)
 Texas Stadium (1979–1986)
 Gerald J. Ford Stadium (2000–present)

Individual achievements
Heisman Trophy
 Doak Walker 1948

Maxwell Award
 Doak Walker 1947

Sammy Baugh Trophy
 Chuck Hixson 1968

College Football Hall of Fame Inductees

All-Americans

Honored jerseys
SMU has honored six jerseys.

Pro Football Hall of Fame inductees

Future non-conference opponents
Announced opponents as of September 16, 2022.

References

External links

 

 
American football teams established in 1915
1915 establishments in Texas